Suspiria de profundis (a Latin phrase meaning "sighs from the depths") is a collection of essays in the form of prose poems by English writer Thomas De Quincey, first published in 1845. An examination of the process of memory as influenced by hallucinogenic drug use, Suspiria has been described as one of the best-known and most distinctive literary works of its era.

Genre
First published in fragmentary form in 1845, the work is a collection of short essays in psychological fantasy — what De Quincey himself called "impassioned prose," and what is now termed prose poetry. The essays of the Suspiria "are among the finest examples of De Quincey's or anyone else's English style."

De Quincey conceived of the collection as a sequel to his masterwork, Confessions of an English Opium-Eater (1821). Like that work, the pieces in Suspiria de Profundis are rooted in the visionary experiences of the author's opium addiction.

Publication
De Quincey left the work incomplete in its original publication in Blackwood's Magazine, in the spring and summer of 1845. He altered its content and added material when he included it in his collected works (1854 and after); and portions of the whole were not published until the first volume of his Posthumous Works in 1891.

Among De Quincey's papers, left after his death in 1859, was discovered a list of 32 items that would have comprised the complete Suspiria, if the work had ever been finished. This master list counts The English Mail-Coach, first published in Blackwood's in October and December 1849, as one of the Suspiria, though critics and scholars universally treat it as a separate work. The long essay The Affliction of Childhood, also on the master list, is more often associated with the Suspiria, since it too was printed in Blackwood's in the Spring of 1845. The Affliction contains De Quincey's childhood recollections of the death of his sister, Elizabeth Quincey (aged 9) who died of meningitis. Yet for the most part, the Suspiria are commonly defined as relatively brief essays, including:

 Dreaming — the introduction to the whole.
 The Palimpsest of the Human Brain — a meditation upon the deeper layers of human consciousness and memory.
 Levana and Our Ladies of Sorrow — beginning with a discussion of Levana, the ancient Roman goddess of childbirth, De Quincey imagines three companions for her: Mater Lachrymarum, Our Lady of Tears; Mater Suspiriorum, Our Lady of Sighs; and Mater Tenebrarum, Our Lady of Darkness. 
 The Apparition of the Brocken — on an optical illusion associated with a German mountaintop.
 Savannah-la-Mar — a threnody on a sunken city, inspired by the 1692 earthquake that sank Port Royal in Jamaica; beginning, "God smote Savannah-la-Mar...."
 Vision of Life — "The horror of life mixed...with the heavenly sweetness of life...."
 Memorial Suspiria — looking forwards and backwards on life's miseries; foreshadowing and anticipation.

When the collection was reprinted in the collected works in the 1850s, another short essay was added: The Daughter of Lebanon, a parable of grief and transcendence.

The four pieces that first appeared posthumously in 1891 are:

 Solitude of Childhood — "Fever and delirium," "sick desire," and the Erl-King's daughter.
 The Dark Interpreter — he was a looming shadow in the author's opium reveries.
 The Princess that lost a Single Seed of a Pomegranate — echoes upon echoes from an Arabian Nights tale.
 Who is this Woman that beckoneth and warneth me from the Place where she is, and in whose Eyes is Woeful remembrance? I guess who she is — "memorials of a love that has departed, has been — the record of a sorrow that is...."

Of all of the pieces, Levana and Our Ladies of Sorrow is arguably the most widely anthologized, the best known, and the most admired. "The whole of this vision is clothed in a prose so stately, intense, and musical that it has been regarded by some...as the supreme achievement of De Quincey's genius, the most original thing he ever wrote."

The lost Suspiria
Out of the 32 pieces on the Suspiria master list, 18 are not extant; they were either planned but never written, or written but lost before publication. (In his later years, De Quincey, working by candlelight, had an unfortunate propensity to set things — his papers; his hair — on fire.) The lost pieces bear evocative and provoking titles:

 The Dreadful Infant (There was the glory of innocence made perfect; there was the dreadful beauty of infancy that had seen God)
 Foundering Ships
 The Archbishop and the Controller of Fire
 God that didst Promise
 Count the Leaves in Vallombrosa
 But if I submitted with Resignation, not the less I searched for the Unsearchable — sometimes in Arab Deserts, sometimes in the Sea
  That ran before us in malice
 Morning of Execution
 Kyrie Eleison
 The Nursery in Arabian Deserts
 The Halcyon Calm and the Coffin
 Faces! Angels' Faces!
 At that Word
 Oh, Apothanate! that hatest death, and cleansest from the Pollution of Sorrow
 Who is this Woman that for some Months has followed me up and down? Her face I cannot see, for she keeps for ever behind me
 Cagot and Cressida
 Lethe and Anapaula
 Oh, sweep away, Angel, with Angelic Scorn, the Dogs that come with Curious Eyes to gaze.

A few pages of Notes for the missing Suspiria were found in the author's papers.

Translation and adaptations
In 1860, Charles Baudelaire, inspired by Suspiria de Profundis and the Confessions, penned the first part of his essay Les paradis artificiels about hashish and opium and their effect on a poet's work. The second segment, entitled "Un mangeur d'Opium", is a translation to French of De Quincey's Confessions, with Baudelaire occasionally adding his own impressions.

Filmmaker Dario Argento used De Quincey's Suspiria, particularly Levana and Our Ladies of Sorrow, as inspiration for his "The Three Mothers" trilogy, which include Suspiria (1977), Inferno (1980) and Mother of Tears (2007). This influence carried over into Luca Guadagnino's 2018 remake of Suspiria.

It was also adapted by Luigi Cozzi in 1989, as Demons 6: il gatto nero, most commonly known as The Black Cat.

Fritz Leiber's novel Our Lady of Darkness, published in 1977, the same year as Argento's Suspiria, quotes from Levana in the introduction, and references the third Mother in the course of the novel.

References

External links
 
 Levana and Our Ladies of Sorrow.

British essays
Fantasy books
Works originally published in Blackwood's Magazine
1845 books
Works by Thomas De Quincey